Anabernicula is an extinct genus of waterfowl related to shelducks that existed from the Pliocene to the Pleistocene.  Four species have been described: A. minuscula, A. gracilenta, A. oregonensis, and A. robusta.

References

Tadorninae
Late Quaternary prehistoric birds
Extinct animals of the United States
Pleistocene birds of North America
Extinct birds of North America
Pliocene birds of North America